Nicholas Kasa (born November 5, 1990) is a former American football tight end who played in the National Football League (NFL). He played college football for the Colorado Buffaloes. He was drafted by the Oakland Raiders in the sixth round of the 2013 NFL Draft and was also a member of the Denver Broncos.

Professional career

Oakland Raiders
Kasa was selected by the Oakland Raiders with the 172nd overall pick in the 2013 NFL Draft.  He played in all 16 games during his rookie season. He caught his first pass, a touchdown, in a Week 17 loss to the Denver Broncos with 37 seconds left in the game from Terrelle Pryor.

On August 12, 2014, Kasa tore his ACL.  On August 26, 2014, Kasa was placed on injured reserve. 

Kasa was released by the Raiders on May 5, 2015, after failing a team physical.

Denver Broncos
Kasa was signed to the Denver Broncos' practice squad on January 25, 2016. The Broncos used him in practice to imitate Greg Olsen, tight end for their Super Bowl 50 opponent, the Carolina Panthers.
On February 7, 2016, Kasa was still part of the Broncos practice squad when the team won Super Bowl 50. In the game, the Broncos defeated the Carolina Panthers by a score of 24–10.

In July 2017, Kasa participated in The Spring League Showcase game.

Personal life
Since September 2017, Kasa has worked in various companies in the Denver area. He currently works as principal account executive for cannabis at Bradsby Group.

References

External links
Oakland Raiders bio
Colorado Buffaloes bio

1990 births
Living people
American football tight ends
Colorado Buffaloes football players
Denver Broncos players
Oakland Raiders players
People from Thornton, Colorado
Players of American football from Colorado
Players of American football from New York (state)
Sportspeople from the Denver metropolitan area
Sportspeople from Rochester, New York
The Spring League players